Coutarnoux is a commune in the Yonne department in Bourgogne-Franche-Comté in north-central France.

The oldest known form of its name is Curtis Arnulfi, "the enclosure belonging to a (Frankish or other German) man named Arnwulf" who invaded Gaul in the 4th to 6th centuries.

See also
Communes of the Yonne department

References

Communes of Yonne